Arnfinn Severin Roald (26 June 1914  –  16 January 1983) was a Norwegian politician for the Labour Party.

He was born in Vigra.

Roald, who belonged to Møre og Romsdal, was never elected directly to the Norwegian Parliament but served as a deputy representative in the periods 1945–1949, 1950–1953, 1954–1957 and 1958–1961. During the third term he was brought in as a replacement representative for Ulrik Olsen, who was appointed to the Cabinet at that time, after Olsen's original replacer Peter Kjeldseth Moe formally moved up in the line of succession to replace Anton Ludvik Alvestad who died in July 1956. Roald sat through that term and then returned to serve in deputy position.

On local level Roald was deputy mayor of Vigra municipality in the period 1959–1963. Before and after this spell he served as a regular member of the municipality council in Vigra, and later in its successor municipality Giske. He retired from this position in 1975.

References

1914 births
1983 deaths
Members of the Storting
Labour Party (Norway) politicians
20th-century Norwegian politicians